This is a list of episodes to the Soreike! Anpanman anime series. Produced by Tokyo Movie Shinsha and directed by Akinori Nagaoka and Shunji Ôga, the series has aired on NTV since October 3, 1988.

Episodes

1988

1989

1990

References

External links
  List of Soreike! Anpanman episodes via Nippon TV's official website

Soreike! Anpanman